Steve Coleman (born September 20, 1956) is an American saxophonist, composer, bandleader and music theorist. In 2014, he was named a MacArthur Fellow.

Early life 
Steve Coleman was born and grew up in South Side, Chicago. He started playing alto saxophone at the age of 14. Coleman attended Illinois Wesleyan University for two years,. followed by a transfer to Roosevelt University (Chicago Musical College).

Coleman moved to New York in 1978 and worked in big bands such as the Thad Jones/Mel Lewis Orchestra, Slide Hampton's big band, Sam Rivers' Studio Rivbea Orchestra, and briefly in Cecil Taylor's big band. Shortly thereafter, Coleman began working as a sideman with David Murray, Doug Hammond, Dave Holland, Michael Brecker and Abbey Lincoln. For the first four years in New York Coleman spent a good deal of time playing in the streets and in tiny clubs with a band that he put together with trumpeter Graham Haynes, the group that would evolve into the ensemble Steve Coleman and Five Elements that would serve as the main ensemble for Coleman's activities. In this group, he developed his concept of improvisation within nested looping structures. Coleman collaborated with other young African-American musicians such as Cassandra Wilson and Greg Osby, and they founded the so-called M-Base movement.

Research
Coleman regards the music tradition he is coming from as African Diasporan culture with essential African retentions, especially a certain kind of sensibility. He searched for these roots and their connections of contemporary African-American music. For that purpose, he travelled to Ghana at the end of 1993 and came in contact with (among others) the Dagomba (Dagbon) people whose traditional drum music uses very complex polyrhythm and a drum language that allows sophisticated speaking through music (described and recorded by John Miller Chernoff). Thus, Coleman was animated to think about the role of music and the transmission of information in non-western cultures. He wanted to collaborate with musicians who were involved in traditions which come out of West Africa. One of his main interests was the Yoruba tradition (predominantly out of western Nigeria) which is one of the Ancient African Religions underlying Santería (Cuba and Puerto Rico), Vodou (Haiti) and Candomblé (Bahia, Brazil). In Cuba, Coleman found the group Afrocuba de Matanzas who specialized in preserving various styles of rumba as well as all in Cuba persisting African traditions which are mixed together under the general title of Santería (Abakuá, Arara, Congo, Yoruba). In 1996 Coleman along with a group of 10 musicians as well as dancers and the group Afrocuba de Matanzas worked together for 12 days, performed at the Havana Jazz Festival, and recorded the album The Sign and the Seal. In 1997 Coleman took a group of musicians from America and Cuba to Senegal to collaborate and participate in musical and cultural exchanges with the musicians of the local Senegalese group Sing Sing Rhythm. He also led his group Five Elements to the south of India in 1998 to participate in a cultural exchange with different musicians in the carnatic music tradition.

In September 2014, Coleman was awarded a MacArthur Fellowship for "refreshing traditional templates to create distinctive and innovative work in ... jazz."

Discography

As leader 
 Motherland Pulse (JMT, 1985)
 On the Edge of Tomorrow (JMT, 1986)
 World Expansion (JMT, 1987)
 Sine Die (Pangaea, 1988) – recorded in 1987–88
 Rhythm People (The Resurrection of Creative Black Civilization) (RCA Novus, 1990)
 Black Science (RCA Novus, 1991) – recorded in 1990
 Phase Space with Dave Holland (Rebel-X, 1991)
 Drop Kick  (RCA Novus, 1992)
 Rhythm in Mind (Novus, 1992) – recorded in 1991
 The Tao of Mad Phat (RCA Novus, 1993)
 We Beez Like That! (InfoMatin, 1995)
 Myths, Modes and Means (BMG, 1995)
 The Way of the Cipher (BMG, 1995)
 Def Trance Beat (BMG, 1995)
 Curves of Life (BMG, 1995)
 Steve Coleman's Music: Live in Paris (BMG, 1995)
 The Sign and the Seal (BMG, 1996)
 Genesis & the Opening of the Way (BMG, 1997)
 The Sonic Language of Myth (RCA Victor, 1999)
 The Ascension to Light (BMG, 2001)
 Resistance Is Futile (Label Bleu, 2001)
 On the Rising of the 64 Paths (Label Bleu, 2002)
 Lucidarium (Label Bleu, 2004)
 Weaving Symbolics (Label Bleu, 2006)
 Invisible Paths: First Scattering (Tzadik, 2007)
 Harvesting Semblances and Affinities (Pi, 2010) – recorded in 2006–07
 The Mancy of Sound (Pi, 2011) – recorded in 2007
 Functional Arrhythmias (Pi, 2013) – recorded in 2012
 Synovial Joints (Pi, 2015) – recorded in 2014
 Morphogenesis  (Pi, 2017) – recorded in 2016
 Live at the Village Vanguard Vol. I (The Embedded Sets) (Pi, 2018) – live
 Live at the Village Vanguard Vol. II (MDW NTR) (Pi, 2021) – live

As group 
M-Base
 Anatomy of a Groove (DIW, 1992) – recorded in 1991–92

As sideman 

With Doug Hammond
 Spaces (Idibib, 1982) – digitally remixed and produced by Coleman (Rebel-X, 1991)
 Perspicuity (L+R, 1991)

With Dave Holland
 1983: Jumpin' In (ECM, 1984)
 1984: Seeds of Time (ECM, 1985)
 1987: The Razor's Edge (ECM, 1987)
 1988: Triplicate (ECM, 1988)
 1989: Extensions (ECM, 1990)

With Thad Jones/Mel Lewis
 One More Time! (PolJazz, 1978)
 Body and Soul (West Wind, 1990)
 The Orchestra (West Wind, 1990)
 A Touch of Class (West Wind, 1992)

With Mel Lewis
 Naturally (Telarc, 1979)
 Live in Montreux (MPS, 1981)

With Abbey Lincoln
 1983: Talking to the Sun (Enja, 1984)
 1997: Who Used to Dance (Verve, 1997)

With Errol Parker
 The Errol Parker Tentet (Sahara, 1982)
 Live at the Wollman Auditorium (Sahara, 1985)

With The Roots
 From the Ground Up (Talkin' Loud, 1994)
 Do You Want More?!!!??! (DGC, 1995) – recorded in 1993–94
 Illadelph Halflife (DGC, 1996)

With Marvin "Smitty" Smith
 Keeper of the Drums (Concord Jazz, 1987)
 The Road Less Traveled (Concord Jazz, 1989)

With Cassandra Wilson
 Point of View (JMT, 1986) – recorded in 1985
 Days Aweigh (JMT, 1987)
 Jumpworld (JMT, 1990)
 Traveling Miles (Blue Note, 1999) – recorded in 1997–98

With others
 Geri Allen, Open on All Sides in the Middle (Minor Music, 1987) – recorded in 1986
 Franco Ambrosetti, Tentets (Enja, 1985)
 Cindy Blackman, Code Red (Muse, 1992) – recorded in 1990
 Bob Brookmeyer, Composer & Arranger (Gryphon, 1980)
 Ravi Coltrane, Moving Pictures (RCA/BMG, 1998) – recorded in 1997
 Stanley Cowell, Back to the Beautiful (Concord Jazz, 1989)
 Dice Raw, Reclaiming the Dead (MCA, 2000)
 Robin Eubanks, Different Perspectives (JMT, 1989)
 The Fleshtones, Brooklyn Sound Solution (Yep Roc, 2011)
 Chico Freeman, Tangents (Elektra Musician, 1984)
 Craig Harris, Souls Within the Veil (Aquastra Music, 2005)
 Billy Hart, Oshumare (Gramavision, 1984)
 Vijay Iyer, Memorophilia (Asian Improv, 1995)
 MC Solaar, Prose Combat (Talkin' Loud, 1994)
 Sato Michihiro, Rodan (hat ART, 1989)
 Andy Milne, Forward to Get Back (D'Note 1997)
 David Murray, Live at Sweet Basil Volume 1 (Black Saint, 1984)
 David Murray, Live at Sweet Basil Volume 2 (Black Saint, 1984)
 Lonnie Plaxico, Plaxico (Muse, 1990)
 Dafnis Prieto, Back to the Sunset (Dafnison Music 2018)
 Sam Rivers, Colours (Black Saint, 1983)
 Sam Rivers' Rivbea All-star Orchestra, Culmination (BMG France, 1999)
 Michele Rosewoman, Quintessence (Enja, 1987)
 Mal Waldron, Soul Eyes (RCA Victor, 1997)

References

1956 births
Jazz musicians from Illinois
Musicians from Chicago
Living people
MacArthur Fellows
20th-century saxophonists
21st-century American saxophonists
African-American jazz composers
African-American jazz musicians
American jazz alto saxophonists
American male saxophonists
DIW Records artists
RCA Records artists
American male jazz composers
American jazz composers
JMT Records artists
20th-century American male musicians
21st-century American male musicians
Label Bleu artists